61st Street may refer to:

61st Street (Manhattan)
61st Street station (SEPTA), a SEPTA trolley stop in Philadelphia, Pennsylvania Subway–Surface Trolley
61st Street – Woodside (IRT Flushing Line), a New York City Subway station
61st (CTA station), Chicago, Illinois
61st Street (TV series), upcoming American legal drama television series